Amiet is a surname. Notable people with the surname include:

Cuno Amiet (1868–1961), Swiss painter, illustrator, graphic artist, and sculptor
Marie Louise Amiet (1879–1944), French painter and illustrator
Pierre Amiet (1922–2021), French archeologist and conservator
William Amiet (1890–1959), Australian writer and barrister